Wartberg an der Krems is a municipality in the district of Kirchdorf an der Krems in the Austrian state of Upper Austria.

Population

References

Cities and towns in Kirchdorf an der Krems District